Bindae-tteok, or mung bean pancake, is a type of buchimgae (Korean pancake) that originated in the Pyongan Province. It is made by grinding soaked mung beans, adding vegetables and meat and pan-frying it into a round, flat shape.

Etymology and history 
Bindae-tteok first appears under the name binja in the Guidebook of Homemade Food and Drinks, a 1670 cookbook written by Jang Gye-hyang. The word appears to be derived from bingjya, the Middle Korean transcription of the hanja word , whose first character is pronounced bǐng and means "round and flat pancake-like food". The pronunciation and the meaning of the second letter are unknown. Tteok means a steamed, boiled, or pan-fried cake; usually a rice cake but in this case a pancake.

During the Joseon era (1392–1897), richer households would dispense bindae-tteok to poorer people gathered outside the South Great Gate of Seoul during times of hardship.

Bindaetteok was often eaten in the northwestern part of Hwanghae-do and Pyeongan-do.

Preparation 
Bindae-tteok is made with the mung bean batter with a filling made of bracken, pork, mung bean sprouts, and baechu-kimchi (napa cabbage kimchi).

To make the filling for bindae-tteok, soaked bracken is cut into short pieces, mixed with ground pork, and seasoned with soy sauce, chopped scallions, minced garlic, ground black pepper, and sesame oil. Mung bean sprouts are washed, blanched, cut into short pieces and seasoned with salt and sesame oil. Kimchi is unstuffed and squeezed to remove its fillings and excess juice, then cut into small pieces. The ingredients are then mixed.

Washed, soaked, and husked mung beans are ground with water and seasoned with salt to make the batter.

The mung bean batter is ladled on a hot frying pan greased with a considerable amount of cooking oil, topped with the filling, and followed by another layer of the batter poured over the top of the filling. Finally, the bindae-tteok is topped with pieces of diagonally sliced green and red chili pepper. The pancakes are pan-fried on both sides, and served with a dipping sauce consisting of soy sauce, vinegar, water, and ground pine nuts.

Gallery

See also 

 Pesarattu

References 

Fried foods
Korean pancakes
Legume dishes